Uścianki  is a village in the administrative district of Gmina Augustów, within Augustów County, Podlaskie Voivodeship, in northeastern Poland.

References

Villages in Augustów County